Calliostoma problematicum is a species of sea snail, a marine gastropod mollusk in the family Calliostomatidae.

Some authors place this taxon in the subgenus Calliostoma (Tristichotrochus)

Description
The height of the shell attains 15 mm.

Distribution
This marine species occurs off Japan.

References

External links
 

problematicum
Gastropods described in 1971